Nathán Pinzón (27 February 1917 – 15 August 1993) was an Argentine actor. He starred in the 1962 film Una Jaula no tiene secretos.

Selected filmography
 Santos Vega (1936)
 Juan Moreira (1948)
 Passport to Rio (1948)
 The Count of Monte Cristo (1953)
 Carnival of Crime (1962)
 Los Neuróticos (1971)
 El Gordo catástrofe (1977)
,”El Vampíro Negro” (1953) Teodoro Ulber, 'El profesor'

References

External links

1917 births
1993 deaths
Argentine male film actors
Burials at La Chacarita Cemetery
20th-century Argentine male actors